NASSP Bulletin is a quarterly peer-reviewed academic journal that covers the field of education administration. The editor-in-chief is Pamela Salazar (University of Nevada). It was established in 1917 and is currently published by SAGE Publications in association with the National Association of Secondary School Principals.

Abstracting and indexing 
NASSP Bulletin is abstracted and indexed in:
 ERIC
 NISC
 ProQuest
 SafetyLit
 Scopus
 Wilson Education Index/Abstracts

External links 
 

SAGE Publishing academic journals
English-language journals
Education journals
Quarterly journals
Publications established in 1917